Patin may refer to:

People
 Charles Patin (1633–1693), French physician and numismatist
 Charlotte-Catherine Patin, 17th- and 18th-century French writer and art critic
 Gabrielle-Charlotte Patin, 17th-century French numismatist
 Guy Patin (1601–1672), French doctor and man of letters
 Henri Patin (1793–1876), French writer and translator from ancient Greek and Latin
 Jacques Patin (died 1587), French painter, decorator, illustrator and engraver
 Madeleine Patin (1610–1682), French moralist
 Mathias Patin (born 1974), French volleyball player
 Sylvie Patin (born 1951), French art historian and conservator-restorer

Places
 Patin, Burkina Faso

Animals
 Basa (fish), a type of catfish also known as patin